Techno-horror is a subgenre of horror fiction that focuses on concerns and fears of technology.  The stories are often  cautionary tales created during periods of rapid technological advancement expressing concerns about privacy, freedom, individuality, and wealth disparity. These stories often include dystopian settings.

Criteria
Techno-horror focuses on how technology is either a direct force of evil, indirectly causes bad things to happen, or how it can be manipulated by people in positions of power to do evil things. Techno-horror relies heavily on elements of science fiction or fantasy, which set it apart from the techno-thriller genre.

Examples
The overthrow or destruction of the human race by AI is a classic example. Others include radiation based terror where toxic waste from technology or radio-waves create mutants and monsters out of humans, or in the case of the 1968 film Night of the Living Dead, radiation from a stray nuclear experiment causes the dead to rise. 
Another prominent example, sourced especially from J-horror, involves classical terrors (such as ghosts, spirits, curses, etc.) propagating, traveling, or communicating via hi-tech media: computer networks, cell phones, cameras etc. Here, modern  technology is not a threat on its own, but rather a new conduit for various dark forces.  The subgenre is notably most popular in the Western world and Japan, with little prominence elsewhere.  This sub-genre of Techno-horror was likely influenced by stories of EVPs.

Films
 The Day the Earth Stood Still (1951) and Forbidden Planet (1956) are some of the earliest known of this genre.  
Midnight Lace (1960)
Night of the Living Dead (1968)
Colossus: The Forbin Project (1970)
The Stepford Wives (1975)
Scanners (1981)
Poltergeist (1982)
Videodrome (1983)
The Terminator (1984)
C.H.U.D. (1984)
Deadly Friend (1986)
Chopping Mall (1986)
The Fly (1986)
Robocop (1987)
Tetsuo: The Iron Man (1989)
The Lawnmower Man (1992)
Ringu (1998)
Existenz (1999)
The Matrix (1999)
Pulse (2001)
The Ring (2002)
Shutter (2004)
White Noise (2005)
Prometheus (2012)
Elysium (2013)
Ex Machina (2014)
Unfriended (2015)
Host (2020)
Sources:

Video games
System Shock (1994)
I Have No Mouth, and I Must Scream (1995)
Fallout (1997)
Fatal Frame (2001)
Enslaved: Odyssey to the West (2010)
Five Nights at Freddy's (2014)
DreadOut (2014)
SOMA (2015)
Observer (2017)

Novels and literature
Nineteen Eighty-Four (1949)
I, Robot (1950)
Second Variety (1953)
I Have No Mouth, and I Must Scream (1967)
Do Androids Dream of Electric Sheep? (1968)
Christine (1983)
Ghost in the Shell (1989)
The Metamorphosis of Prime Intellect (2002)
Crawlers: A Novel (2003)
Cell (2006)
Under the Dome (2009)
The Dark Net (2017)

See also
 Science fiction horror
 List of techno-thriller novels
 Technophobia
 Isekai
 Tech noir
 Postmodern horror
 Art horror

References

Further reading

 
Horror genres
Fictional technology
1950s in film
1960s in film
1970s in film
1980s in film
1990s in film
2010s in film